The Wright R-1300 Cyclone 7 is an American air-cooled seven-cylinder supercharged radial aircraft engine produced by Curtiss-Wright.

Design and development 

The R-1300 is basically a single row Wright R-2600. The engine was mass-produced but not widely used. Engineering began in 1942 but the first flight of an R-1300 did not take place until 1949. The engine was produced under license by Kaiser-Frazer and later by AVCO Lycoming.

The engine was used in combat — the R-1300-1A and -1B in the A model North American T-28 Trojan and the R-1300-3, -3A, -3C and -3D in the Sikorsky H-19 Chickasaw. The R-1300-1B was used to power the Ayres Thrush. The R-1300-4 and -4A were used in the N class blimp; 50 of these variants were produced by AVCO.

Early-production engines had vibration problems, an improved lateral dampener in the crank brought about most of the model changes.

Variants
R-1300-1A

R-1300-2
A direct drive version of the R-1300-1. It had a 0.5625:1 reduction drive.  Both used the PD9F1 carburetor.
R-1300-2A

R-1300-3
Derated to 690.3 hp (515 kW), uses forced-air cooling fan and uses a PD9G1 carburetor.
R-1300-4
Similar to the R-1300-1, uses some different accessory components.
R-1300-CB7A1
With reduction gear for use on fixed wing aircraft.

Applications
 N class blimp
 North American T-28 Trojan
 Rockwell Thrush Commander
 Sikorsky H-19
 Westland Whirlwind

Specifications (R-1300-1A)

See also

References

External links

Video of an R-1300 engine run on a North American T-28A

1940s aircraft piston engines
Aircraft air-cooled radial piston engines
R-1300